Jean-Pierre Aulneau de la Touche (21 April 1705 – 8 June 1736) was a Jesuit missionary priest who was briefly active in New France and killed before he could take part in his first major assignment which was to be an expedition to the Mandan.  He died near Fort St. Charles, on Lake of the Woods in an area now in Ontario, Canada and Minnesota, United States. He was killed while traveling with Jean Baptiste de La Vérendrye, and is often referred to as "Minnesota's Forgotten Martyr."

Early life
Jean-Pierre Aulneau was born at his father's chateau at Moutiers-sur-le-Lay, Vendée, France. He studied at the minor seminary of Luçon prior to entering the Jesuit novitiate at Pau in 1720. He spent a number of years as an instructor in La Rochelle and Poitiers. After his ordination to the priesthood, he sailed for Canada New France in 1734.

His crossing on Le Ruby was stormy and, as was typical, the ship's passengers and crew shared diseases in the close quarters.  Aulneau landed at Quebec City in Canada on 12 August 1734. After recovering his health, he lodged at the Jesuit College in Quebec, preparing for his final examination, which he passed during Lent of 1735.

Black robe in the Northwest
After receiving an assignment as chaplain, the missionary (whom the Indians called the "Black Robes") set out for Fort St. Charles in June 1735.  He sailed through the Great Lakes to Fort St. Charles along with Pierre Gaultier de La Vérendrye, commander of the western district.  At the time, Aulneau was posted farther west than any other missionary in North America.  His letters to his mother in France reveal that he was afraid of being assigned so far away from his confessor and the support of the church.  He was to join the local Assinboine and travel with them to the Mandan.

The following year Aulneau, Jean Baptiste de La Vérendrye and 19 French-Canadian voyageurs were sent from Fort St. Charles to Fort Michilimackinac.  They were to pick up supplies for an expedition to the Mandan people in what is today the North and South Dakota. In addition, the trip would allow Aulneau a last visit to the confessional before accompanying the explorers on their long journey.  His letters to his family showed a young man filled with excitement about his mission to the Mandans, whom he was eager to convert to the Roman Catholic faith.

Martyrdom
On their first night out and within several kilometres of the fort, all members of the expedition were killed by "Prairie Sioux" warriors on a nearby island in Lake of the Woods.  The date was 8 June 1736.  The massacre was allegedly in retaliation for commander La Vérendrye's practice of supplying guns to Sioux enemies, especially the Assiniboine and the Cree.  The Catholic Church has considered Aulneau a martyr in the effort to convert the Native peoples to Christianity.

Aftermath
When members of the friendly Cree tribe reported the massacre to La Verendrye, he gave orders for the heads of the 19 voyageurs and the decapitated remains of his son and Aulneau to be returned to Fort St. Charles. The bodies of Aulneau and young La Verendrye were encased in a rough hewn coffin and buried beneath the altar of the fortress chapel. The heads of the 19 voyageurs were buried together in a nearby trench.

For a time, the massacre ended the Church's project of a mission to the Mandan.  There was no other priest further west than Fort Michilimackinac.  It was not until 1741 that the priest Claude-Godefroy Coquart, a replacement for Aulneau, began his journey west.  He would have spent some time at Fort St. Charles before moving on to join the La Vérendryes at Fort La Reine (presently Portage la Prairie, Manitoba) in 1743.  Coquart was the first recorded missionary in present-day Manitoba and the first to travel beyond Lake of the Woods.

Legacy
The letters of Aulneau to his family were discovered with Aulneau descendants in Vendée, France in 1889.  They were published in an English translation in 1893 as The Aulneau Collection  Academics at St. Boniface College in Winnipeg read The Aulneau Collection, which inspired a number of expeditions to discover the old sites.  By 1908 they had located the old fort, as well as the probable location of Massacre Island.
 
By using the letters of Aulneau and the oral tradition of the Ojibwe, in 1908 a Jesuit team from Saint Boniface College located the site of Fort St. Charles.  It was just inside the territorial waters of the United States.  They excavated and examined the remains of the martyred priest and his companions.  The remains of Aulneau were identified by the hook from his cassock and his rosary, which had been placed at his feet.  The party transferred the human remains and artifacts found at Fort St. Charles across the Canada–US border to St. Boniface College, where they remain to this day.

To honor its Golden Anniversary in Minnesota, in 1949 the Knights of Columbus raised funds to buy the property of the former Fort St. Charles and build a replica of the fort there.  They also created a shrine for Aulneau.  The property is now owned by the Roman Catholic Diocese of Crookston, Minnesota, and is a site of pilgrimage.

See also 

Canadian Martyrs
Charles-Michel Mesaiger

References 

Lund, Duane R. Lake of the Woods: Earliest Accounts. Nordell Graphic Communications, Staples, Minn.1984
The Encyclopedia of Canada, Vol. IV, Toronto: University Associates of Canada, 1948
The Aulneau Collection, Edited by Father Arthur Jones, S.J., Montreal: Saint Mary's College, 1893

Further reading

"Lettres du père Aulneau," APQ Rapport, 1926–27, 259–330.
Le Jeune, Dictionnaire, I, 98f.; II, 112–16.
Rochemonteix, Les Jésuites et la N.-F. au XVIIIe siècle, I, 212–25.
Paul Desjardins, "Le projet de mission du Père Aulneau chez les Mandanes," SCHEC Rapport, 1948–49, 55–69.

External links 
 The Aulneau Collection, Available for download on "The Internet Archive"
 

1705 births
1736 deaths
People from Vendée
Pre-statehood history of Minnesota
French Roman Catholic missionaries
18th-century French Jesuits
Martyred Roman Catholic priests
Roman Catholic Ecclesiastical Province of Saint Paul and Minneapolis
18th-century Roman Catholic martyrs
Jesuit missionaries in New France